Chesham Bois (traditionally , but now more commonly ) is a village in the Chiltern Hills, in Buckinghamshire, England, adjacent to both Amersham and Chesham.

History
Initially a hamlet in the parish of Chesham, the manor was assessed at 1½ hides in the reign of King Edward the Confessor. The estate belonged to a brother of King Harold, who was killed with him at the Battle of Hastings, and William the Conqueror probably gave this "royal" land to his own half-brother, Odo, Bishop of Bayeux. The village gets its name from the de Bosco family (the French version of which was "de Bois") and by 1213 in the reign of King John a William du Bois was holding the manor. By about 1430, in the reign of Henry VI, the manor had been acquired by the Cheynes of Chenies who remained for over 300 years, before conveying the manor to the Duke of Bedford in 1735. Chesham Bois House, the site of the manor, was the subject of an archaeological excavation by television programme Time Team, which was broadcast in the United Kingdom on Channel 4 in March 2007.

Famous people
Famous people born in Chesham Bois include the crime writer and composer Edmund Crispin; Lieutenant Commander Peter Scawen Watkinson Roberts, who was awarded the Victoria Cross for gallantry in the face of the enemy during World War II; and Mervyn King, former governor of the Bank of England. Chesham Bois was for a time, home to artist William Monk.

Today
The village contains two churches: the Anglican church of St. Leonard's (started in the 12th century) and the Roman Catholic Church of Our Lady of Perpetual Succour (built in 1915 and extended in 1953). Chesham Bois C of E School (1893) is located down Bois Lane, a mixed primary school with over 200 pupils. The Beacon School is also located in the village and is an independent preparatory school educating over 400 boys. Also located in the village is Our Lady's Roman Catholic Combined School which is opposite the church of the same name. Elangeni School is situated at the end of Woodside Avenue and is a mixed state school.  A  sycamore and ash wood and common is the site of a cricket pavilion, as well as being the site for the biennial village fete.

Although "two hundred years ago it was in the depths of the country, a small village with no more than twenty-four houses", today some of Chesham Bois merges into Amersham-on-the-Hill.

References

External links

Pictures of Chesham Bois
Amersham Museum

Villages in Buckinghamshire
Civil parishes in Buckinghamshire